The following lists events that happened during 2016 in Papua New Guinea.

Incumbents
Monarch: Elizabeth II 
Governor-General: Michael Ogio 
Prime Minister: Peter O'Neill

Provincial Governors
Central: Kila Haoda
Chimbu: Noah Kool
East New Britain: Ereman Tobaining Jr.
East Sepik: Michael Somare
Enga: Peter Ipatas
Gulf: Havila Kavo
Hela: Francis Potape then Anderson Agiru then Philip Undialu then Francis Potape
Jikawa: William Tongamp
Madang: Jim Kas
Manus: Charlie Benjamin
Milne Bay: Titus Philemon
Morobe: Kelly Naru
New Ireland: Julius Chan
Oro: Gary Juffa
Sandaun: Amkat Mai
Southern Highlands: William Powl
West New Britain: Sasindran Muthuvel
Western: Ati Wobiro
Western Highlands: Paias Wingti

Events

May
May 29 - Anti-government protests erupt against Prime Minister O'Neill citing corruption and fraud.

June
June 8 - Police open fire on student protesters at the University of Papua New Guinea in Port Moresby, protesting against Prime Minister Peter O'Neill, killing four and leaving another seven injured. Police deny the deaths and claim they only used tear gas. A court grants an injunction barring students from protesting on campus while thousands protest and boycott classes calling for O'Neill's resignation over corruption allegations.
June 9 - Protest leader Noel Anjo demands the Prime Minister either resign or hand himself to police, getting arrested and charged for corruption, and declares the protests will not end otherwise.

August
August 3 - A court demands the closure of Manus Island's facility owned by Australia housing migrants.
August 17 - The governments of Australia and Papua New Guinea confirm the closure of Manus Regional Processing Centre following a request by the supreme court.

References

 
Papua New Guinea
2010s in Papua New Guinea
Years of the 21st century in Papua New Guinea
Papua New Guinea